The John Woodward House is a historic house at 50 Fairlee Road in Newton, Massachusetts.  Built sometime before 1686, it is one of the city's oldest surviving buildings.  It is a -story timber-frame structure, with a large central chimney, and is four bays wide and one deep.  Its front entry has sidelight windows that were probably added in the 19th century, and the entry is enclosed in a Colonial Revival portico.  The house was for 275 years owned by the family of John Woodward, one of Newton's early settlers.

The house was listed on the National Register of Historic Places in 1986.

See also
 National Register of Historic Places listings in Newton, Massachusetts

References

Houses on the National Register of Historic Places in Newton, Massachusetts
Houses completed in 1686
1686 establishments in Massachusetts
Colonial architecture in Massachusetts